The Canadian federal budget for fiscal year 2000-2001 was presented by Minister of Finance Paul Martin in the House of Commons of Canada on 28 February 2000. The Budget included substantial tax cuts for all families, whether they be poor, middle class or wealthy. On average, taxpayers were projected to receive a 15% tax cut, to be gradually implemented over the next 4 years.

External links 

 Budget Speech
 Budget Plan
 Budget in Brief

References

Canadian budgets
2000 in Canadian law
2000 government budgets
2000 in Canadian politics